Shadows: Heretic Kingdoms is an action role-playing game released on Windows in November 2014. An isometric game, it is developed by the Slovakian studio Games Farm, formerly known as 3D People, and published by bitComposer Games. The predecessor of Shadows is Kult: Heretic Kingdoms, published in 2004,  the successor is Shadows: Awakening.

Gameplay
The core element of Shadows: Heretic Kingdoms is its internally conflicted main character and the associated unique party system. Seamlessly switching between the Devourer and up to three party members, each with their own special abilities, provides strategic depth in battle, while switching between worlds also allows players to outwit their opponents in battle, avoiding traps and solving puzzles along the way.

Plot

Development

Reception

References

External links
Official website (archived page)

2014 video games
Fantasy video games
Role-playing video games
Windows games
Windows-only games
Video games developed in Slovakia
BitComposer Interactive games